This is a list of campaigns during the Pacific War.

Flags indicate the country, or countries, winning the offensive.

Second Sino-Japanese war

Before 1942 and inclusion in the Pacific War:
  1937-07-07 – 1937-07-09 Marco Polo Bridge Incident
  1937-08-13 – 1937-11-26 Battle of Shanghai
  1937-09-01 – 1937-11-09 Battle of Taiyuan
  1937-12-09 – 1938-01-31 Battle of Nanjing
  1938-03-24 – 1938-05-01 Battle of Xuzhou
  1938-06-11 – 1938-10-27 Battle of Wuhan
  1939-03-17 – 1939-05-09 Battle of Nanchang
  1939-04-20 – 1939-05-24 Battle of Suixian-Zaoyang
  1939-09-13 – 1939-10-08 Battle of Changsha (1939)
  1939-11-15 – 1940-11-30 Battle of South Guangxi
  1940-05-01 – 1940-06-18 Battle of Zaoyang-Yichang
  1940-08-20 – 1940-12-05 Hundred Regiments Offensive
  1941-01-30 – 1941-03-01 Battle of South Henan
  1941-03-14 – 1941-04-09 Battle of Shanggao
  1941-05-07 – 1941-05-27 Battle of South Shanxi
  1941-09-06 – 1941-10-08 Battle of Changsha (1941)
After inclusion in the Pacific War:
  1941-12-24 – 1942-01-15 Battle of Changsha (1942)
  1942-05-14 – 1942-09-07 Zhejiang-Jiangxi Campaign
  1943-05-12 – 1943-06-03 Battle of West Hubei
  1943-11-02 – 1943-12-20 Battle of Changde
  1944-04-17 – 1944-12-10 Operation Ichi-Go
  1945-04-09 – 1945-06-07 Battle of West Hunan
  1945-04-18 — 1945-08-04 Second Guangxi Campaign
 Franco-Japanese Border War
 1940-09-22 – 1940-09-25 Battle of Lạng Sơn
 1940-09-24 – 1940-09-26 Bombing of Hải Phòng

 Franco-Thai War
 October 1940 – 9 May 1941

 Soviet–Japanese border conflicts
 1938-07-29 – 1938-08-11 Battle of Lake Khasan
 1939-05-11 – 1939-09-16 Battles of Khalkhin Gol

Japanese conquest of Southeast Asia and Pacific

  1941-12-07 (12-08 Asian Time) Attack on Pearl Harbor
  1941-12-08 Japanese invasion of Thailand
  1941-12-08 Battle of Guam (1941)
 1941-12-07 Japan declares war on the United States and the United Kingdom; 1941-12-08 The United States and the United Kingdom declare war on Japan
  1941-12-08 – 1941-12-25 Battle of Hong Kong
  1941-12-08 – 1942-01-31 Malayan Campaign
  1941-12-11 – 1941-12-24 Battle of Wake Island
  1941-12-16 – 1942-04-01 Battle of Borneo (1941–42)
  1941-12-22 – 1942-05-06 Battle of the Philippines
 1942-01-01 – 1945-10-25 Transport of POWs via hell ships
  1942-01-11 – 1942-01-12 Battle of Tarakan
  1942-01-23 Battle of Rabaul (1942)
  1942-01-24 Battle of Balikpapan
 1942-01-25 Thailand declares war on the Allies
  1942-01-30 – 1942-02-03 Battle of Ambon
  1942-01-30 – 1942-02-15 Battle of Singapore
  1942-02-04 Battle of Makassar Strait
  1942-02-14 – 1942-02-15 Battle of Palembang
  1942-02-19 Air raids on Darwin, Australia
  1942-02-19 – 1942-02-20 Battle of Badung Strait
  1942-02-19 – 1943-02-10 Battle of Timor
  1942-02-27 – 1942-03-01 Battle of the Java Sea
  1942-03-01 Battle of Sunda Strait
  1942-03-01 – 1942-03-09 Battle of Java
  1942-03-31 Battle of Christmas Island
  1942-03-31 – 1942-04-10 Indian Ocean raid
 1942-04-09 Bataan Death March begins
  1942-04-18 Doolittle Raid
  1942-05-03 Japanese invasion of Tulagi
  1942-05-04 – 1942-05-08 Battle of the Coral Sea
  1942-05-31 – 1942-06-08 Attacks on Sydney Harbour area, Australia
  1942-06-04 – 1942-06-06 Battle of Midway

Allied offensives

South East Asian campaigns: 1941-12-08 – 1945-08-15
      Burma Campaign: 1941-12-16 – 1945-08-15
   October 1943 – March 1945 Battle of Northern Burma and Western Yunnan
  1945-05-15 – 1945-05-16 Battle of the Malacca Strait

New Guinea campaign
  1942-01-23 – Battle of Rabaul
 1942-03-07 – Operation Mo (Japanese invasion of mainland New Guinea)
   1942-05-04 – 1942-05-08 Battle of the Coral Sea
  1942-07-01 – 1943-01-31 Kokoda Track Campaign
   1942-08-25 – 1942-09-05 Battle of Milne Bay
   1942-11-19 – 1943-01-23 Battle of Buna-Gona
   1943-01-28 – 1943-01-30 Battle of Wau
   1943-03-02 – 1943-03-04 Battle of the Bismarck Sea
   1943-06-29 – 1943-09-16 Battle of Lae
    1943-06-30 – 1944-03-25 Operation Cartwheel
   1943-09-19 – 1944-04-24 Finisterre Range campaign
   1943-09-22 – 1944-01-15 Huon Peninsula campaign
    1943-11-01 – 1943-11-11 Attack on Rabaul
    1943-12-15 – 1945-08-15 New Britain campaign
  1944-02-29 – 1944-03-25 Admiralty Islands campaign
   1944-04-22 – 1945-08-15 Western New Guinea campaign

Madagascar Campaign
  1942-05-05 – 1942-11-06 Battle of Madagascar

Aleutian Islands Campaign
   1942-06-06 – 1943-08-15 Battle of the Aleutian Islands
   1942-06-07 – 1943-08-15 Battle of Kiska
  1943-03-26 – Battle of the Komandorski Islands

Guadalcanal Campaign
     1942-08-07 – 1943-02-09 Battle of Guadalcanal
  1942-08-09 Battle of Savo Island
   1942-08-24 – 1942-08-25 Battle of the Eastern Solomons
  1942-10-11 – 1942-10-12 Battle of Cape Esperance
 1942-10-25 – 1942-10-27 Battle of the Santa Cruz Islands
   1942-11-13 – 1942-11-15 Naval Battle of Guadalcanal
  1942-11-30 Battle of Tassafaronga

Solomon Islands campaign
  1943-01-29 – 1943-01-30 Battle of Rennell Island
  1943-03-06 Battle of Blackett Strait
     1943-06-10 – 1943-08-25 New Georgia Campaign
 1943-07-06 Battle of Kula Gulf
  1943-07-12 – 1943-07-13 Battle of Kolombangara
  1943-08-06 – 1943-08-07 Battle of Vella Gulf
  1943-08-17 – 1943-08-18 Battle off Horaniu
    1943-08-15 – 1943-10-09 Land Battle of Vella Lavella
  1943-10-06 Naval Battle of Vella Lavella
     1943-11-01 – 1945-08-21 Battle of Bougainville
  1943-11-01 – 1943-11-02 Battle of Empress Augusta Bay
  1943-11-26 Battle of Cape St. George

Gilbert and Marshall Islands campaign
  1943-11-20 – 1943-11-23 Battle of Tarawa
  1943-11-20 – 1943-11-24 Battle of Makin
  1944-01-31 – 1944-02-07 Battle of Kwajalein
  1944-02-16 – 1944-02-17 Attack on Truk
  1944-02-16 – 1944-02-23 Battle of Eniwetok

Bombing of South East Asia, 1944-45
   Operation Cockpit 1944-04-19
   Operation Transom 1944-05-17
   Bombing of Bangkok 1944-05-20
  Operation Matterhorn 1944-06-05 – May 1945
  Operation Meridian 1945-01-24 – 1945-01-29

Mariana and Palau Islands campaign
  1944-06-15 – 1944-07-09 Battle of Saipan
  1944-06-19 – 1944-06-20 Battle of the Philippine Sea
  1944-07-21 – 1944-08-10 Battle of Guam
  1944-07-24 – 1944-08-01 Battle of Tinian
  1944-09-15 – 1944-11-25 Battle of Peleliu
  1944-09-17 – 1944-09-30 Battle of Angaur

Philippines campaign
   1944-10-20 – 1944-12-10 Battle of Leyte
   1944-10-24 – 1944-10-25 Battle of Leyte Gulf
  1944-11-11 – 1944-12-21 Battle of Ormoc Bay
    1944-12-15 – 1945-07-04 Battle of Luzon
   1945-01-09 Invasion of Lingayen Gulf
   1945-01-31 – 1945-02-08 Recapture of Bataan
   1945-02-03 – 1945-03-03 Battle of Manila
   1945-03-18 – 1945-07-30 Battle of the Visayas
   1945-03-10 – 1945-08-15 Battle of Mindanao

Volcano and Ryukyu Islands campaign 
  1945-02-16 – 1945-03-26 Battle of Iwo Jima
      1945-04-01 – 1945-06-21 Battle of Okinawa
  1945-04-07 Operation Ten-Go

Borneo campaign
    1945-05-01 – 1945-05-25 Battle of Tarakan
  1945-06-10 – 1945-06-15 Battle of Brunei
  1945-06-10 – 1945-06-22 Battle of Labuan
  1945-06-17 – 1945-08-15 Battle of North Borneo
   1945-07-07 – 1945-07-21 Battle of Balikpapan

Japan campaign
  1945-07-22 Battle of Tokyo Bay
  1945-08-06 – 1945-08-09 Atomic bombings of Hiroshima and Nagasaki

Soviet invasion of Manchuria
 1945-08-08 – 1945-09-02 Soviet invasion of Manchuria

Command areas
The command structures of the Pacific War varied, reflecting the different roles of various belligerent nations, and often involving different geographic scopes. These included the following:

 American commands:
 Pacific Ocean Areas
 South West Pacific Area
 British and Allied commands:
 GHQ India, commanding the British Army in India
 Eastern Fleet
 American-British-Dutch-Australian Command
 South East Asia Command
 Far East Command, the Soviet command during the war against Japan in 1945
 Japanese commands:
 Japanese Combined Fleet, the Japanese command which oversaw naval operations
 Southern Expeditionary Army Group, the Japanese army command in the South West Pacific and South East Asia

References
 

Pacific
Campaigns
Pacific War campaigns